Time Team America is an American television series that airs on PBS. It premiered on July 8, 2009. It is an Oregon Public Broadcasting adaptation of the British show Time Team, produced in collaboration with Channel 4, which commissioned the original show, in which a team of archeologists and other experts are given 72 hours to excavate an historic site.

The U.S. version features "freelance and university-affiliated experts [who] mostly join existing excavations ... [and] arrive with resources that the archaeologists already on the case usually can’t afford and specific questions that, if answered, will advance the understanding of the site."

A second season was announced on October 18, 2011, scheduled to shoot during the summer of 2012 and to air in 2013.
On December 20, 2011, PBS announced that Justine Shapiro would host the second season.

Episodes
When PBS introduced a video player on its website in mid-April 2009, an episode of Time Team America became the most viewed.
 
Original air dates are as announced by PBS, but may vary by PBS station.

Season 1 (2009)

Season 2
After a four-year gap, Videotext Communications/PBS produced the second season, which aired in 2014.

Reviews
A Newsday reviewer wrote
"Time Team America at moments, employs [an] approach much in favor at PBS, which worries – needlessly, I think – that the only way to make serious subjects appealing to the attention-deficit-disordered youth of our TV nation is to throw in plenty of zing, zest and zip. ... But don't hold any of this against the show, because it's engaging, thoughtful, smart, nicely produced and really, really interesting."

DVD
All five episodes of the first season have been released on separate DVDs.

See also
 List of Time Team episodes
 Time Team Specials
 Time Team Others

References

Bibliography

External links
 
 

PBS original programming
2009 American television series debuts
2009 American television series endings
2000s American documentary television series
Archaeology of the United States
American television series based on British television series
Time Team